Indira Hinduja is an Indian gynecologist, obstetrician and infertility specialist based in Mumbai. She pioneered the Gamete intrafallopian transfer (GIFT) technique resulting in the birth of India's first GIFT baby on 4 January 1988. Previously she delivered India's first test tube baby at KEM Hospital on 6 August 1986. She is also credited for developing an oocyte donation technique for menopausal and premature ovarian failure patients, giving the country's first baby out of this technique on 24 January 1991.

Academic career
She has obtained PhD degree for her thesis entitled 'Human in Vitro Fertilization and Embryo Transfer' from the Bombay University. She is a full-time practicing Obstetrician and Gynaecologist of the P.D. Hinduja Hospital, Mahim West, Bombay.

Hinduja is currently also honorary obstetrician and gynecologist at P.D. Hinduja National Hospital and Medical Research Centre in Mumbai.

Awards
Young Indian Award (1987)
Outstanding Lady Citizen of Maharashtra State Jaycee Award (1987)
Bharat Nirman Award for Talented Ladies (1994)
International Women's Day Award by the Mayor of Bombay (1995; 2000) 
Lifetime Achievement Award by Federation of Obstetrics and Gynaecological Society of India (1999)
Dhanvantari Award by The Governor of Maharashtra (2000)
Padma Shri award from Government of India (2011)

References

Living people
People from Shikarpur District
Medical doctors from Mumbai
University of Mumbai alumni
Recipients of the Padma Shri in medicine
Indian women gynaecologists
Indian gynaecologists
20th-century Indian women scientists
20th-century Indian medical doctors
Indian obstetricians
Women scientists from Maharashtra
20th-century women physicians
1946 births